Krauseia is an extinct genus of small mammal from the Paleocene of North America. It was a member of the extinct order Multituberculata and is within the suborder of Cimolodonta, family Neoplagiaulacidae. The genus was nemed by Vianey-Liaud M. in 1986, and has also partly been known under the name Parectypodus.

The species Krauseia clemensi was named by Sloan R.E. in 1981, and is klso known as Parectypodus clemensi. Fossil remains of members of this species have been found in the Torrejonian (Paleocene)-age strata of the San Juan Basin of New Mexico and Wyoming. An approximate weight comparison for P. clemensi is the weight of one standard mouse, around 25 g.

References 
 Sloan (1981), "Systematics of Paleocene multituberculates from the San Juan Basin, New Mexico", p. 127-160, in Lucas et al. (eds), Advances in San Juan Basin paleontology. University of New Mexico Press, Albuquerque.
 Kielan-Jaworowska Z. & Hurum J.H. (2001), "Phylogeny and Systematics of multituberculate mammals". Paleontology 44, p. 389-429.
 Vianey-Liaud (1986), "Les Multituberculés Thanétiens de France, et leurs rapports avec les Multituberculés Nord-Américains". Palaeontogr. Abt. A: Paläozool. Stratigr. 191 p. 85-171, 3 plates.
 Much of this information has been derived from MESOZOIC MAMMALS; Ptilodontoidea, an Internet directory.

Ptilodontoids
Paleocene mammals
Paleocene genus extinctions
Cenozoic animals of North America
Prehistoric mammal genera